The 1999-00 Ohio Bobcats men's basketball team represented Ohio University in the college basketball season of 1999–2000. The team was coached by Larry Hunter and played their home games at the Convocation Center.

Roster

Preseason
The preseason poll was announced by the league office on October 21, 1999.

Preseason men's basketball poll
(First place votes in parenthesis)

East Division
  (15) 230
  (17) 220
  173 
  (2) 150
 Ohio (4) 146
  103
  40

West Division
  (20) 189
 Ball State (11) 162
  (3) 123
  (3) 117
  (1) 116
  87

Tournament champs
Kent State (15), Akron (12), Bowling Green (3), Ohio (4), Marshall (2), Toledo (1), Northern Illinois (1)

Schedule and results
Source:  

|-
!colspan=9 style=| Regular Season

|-
!colspan=9 style=| MAC Tournament

|-

Statistics

Team Statistics
Final 1999–2000 Statistics

Source

Player statistics

Source

Awards and honors

All-MAC Awards 

Source

References

Ohio Bobcats men's basketball seasons
Ohio
Bob
Bob